Daniel S. Yenchesky is a brigadier general and chief of staff of the Wisconsin Air National Guard. Other positions Yenchesky has held include commander of the 128th Air Refueling Wing. He is a graduate of the United States Air Force Academy.

References

Military personnel from Milwaukee
Wisconsin National Guard personnel
National Guard (United States) generals
United States Air Force Academy alumni
Living people
Year of birth missing (living people)